

Launchpad Records is a record label which specialises in Grime music.

Launchpad Records' first releases were with Wiley in 2010, with the singles The Radio Kid and Joombi. Notable Launchpad artists also include Tre Mission, Big H, Big Narstie, Durrty Goodz and Dot Rotten.

British record labels
Record labels established in 2010